Angie Westhoff (born 1965 in Munich) is a German writer of children's literature.

Biography 
Following school, Angie Westhoff studied German Philology and History at the Ludwig-Maximilian-Universität München and worked as coach and lecturer in international teacher-training. Since 2006, she is writing children's and juvenile literature. In 2013 Angie Westhoff was selected to be one of four new members of the South German literary circle "Die Turmschreiber".

Publications 
 Ein Fall für Penelope Klopp Verlag, Hamburg 2007
 Ein neuer Fall für Penelope Klopp Verlag, Hamburg 2007
 Die Klapperschlangen (Band 1-6) Klopp Verlag, Hamburg 2008-2011
 Das Buch der seltsamen Wünsche Klopp Verlag, Hamburg 2010
 Die Nachtflüsterin Klopp Verlag, Hamburg 2011
 Heldengeburtstage Pink, Hamburg 2012
 Die Klapperschlangen (Band 1-6) Oetinger Taschenbuch Verlag, Hamburg 2012/13
 Das Buch der seltsamen Wünsche Oetinger Taschenbuch Verlag, Hamburg 2013
 Rockprinzessin Pink, Hamburg 2013
 Das Dschungelbuch Ellermann Verlag, Hamburg 2013
 Alles wegen Amélie - Paris Oetinger Taschenbuch Verlag, Hamburg 2013
 Amélie v Paříži CooBoo Verlag, Prag 2014
 Der kleine Lord Ellermann Verlag, Hamburg 2014
 Der geheime Club Pink, Hamburg 2015
 Robin Hood Ellermann Verlag, Hamburg 2016
 Robin Hood (Hörbuch) Igel Records, Dortmund 2016
 Bellas zauberhafte Glücksmomente Random House, München 2016
 Das Buch der seltsamen Wünsche. Der 13. Wunsch; Band 2 Oetinger Taschenbuch GmbH, Hamburg 2017

Awards 
In 2011, her book Das Buch der seltsamen Wünsche was included in the recommendations by the International Youth-Library (The White Ravens).

External links 
 Official Website of the Author

References 

1965 births
German children's writers
20th-century German women writers
21st-century German women writers
German women children's writers
Living people